Doukyusei (Japanese: 同級生,  "classmates"), alternately or dōkyūsei or doukyuusei, may refer to:

Classmates (manga), a manga series released in Japan as Doukyusei, and its film adaptation Doukyusei: Classmates
Dōkyūsei (video game series), an eroge video game series
Dōkyūsei (video game), the first game in the series